Hazel is a single-panel cartoon series by Ted Key about a live-in maid who works for a middle-class family. Launched in 1943, Hazel ended September 29, 2018.

Publication history 
The character of Hazel came to Key in 1943 during a dream that he drew the next morning and sent to The Saturday Evening Post, where it quickly became a popular series.

Hazel ran weekly in The Saturday Evening Post until the magazine ceased publication in 1969, after which the cartoon was picked up for daily newspaper syndication by King Features Syndicate, starting on June 16, 1969. Key continued to draw Hazel until his retirement in 1993. 
Ted Key died in May 2008. 

In 2008, King Features was reprinting Hazel panels in more than 50 newspapers.

Characters
 Hazel, the live-in maid to the Baxter family, also serving as nanny to the children.
 George Baxter, ostensible head of the household.
 Dorothy Baxter, George's wife.
 Harold Baxter, the son of George and Dorothy.
 Katie Baxter, the Baxters' adopted younger child.
 Smiley the dog.
 Mostly the cat.
 Two Ton, another cat, named for its size.

In 2008, the cartoonist's son, Peter Key, talked about the origin of the character, "Like a lot of creative people, he kept a notepad near his bedside. He had a dream about a maid who took a message, but she screwed it up completely. When he looked at the idea the next day, he thought it was good and sold it to The Post." 

Shortly afterward, the wry and bossy household maid was given the name Hazel, along with employment at the Baxter household. Peter Key recalled, "He picked the name Hazel out of the air, but there was an editor at The Post who had a sister named Hazel. She thought her brother came up with the name, and she didn’t speak to him for two years."

Books 
Key's cartoons were reprinted in a series of books, including Here's Hazel and All Hazel. The first in the series, Hazel, was published by E. P. Dutton in 1946, and sold 500,000 copies. Kirkus Reviews commented:
Cartoons from the next to last page of The Saturday Evening Post, in which Hazel, a slightly dimmed jewel of a domestic, puts her employers and their friends through their paces with no hesitation about taking the center of the stage. Joining in their games, their parties, their conversations, their arguments, court of appeal for household decisions, intimidating the unwary, demanding-and grabbing-her rights, Hazel is certainly the least inhibited person on paper today. You may start off disliking her and her omnipresence in the household, but sooner or later one of her cracks will get you—and you'll be sold.

Television

Key adapted his cartoon series into the television show Hazel, starring Shirley Booth, who won two Emmy Awards portraying the titular maid. It ran from 1961 to 1965 on NBC; for its final 1965-66 season, the show switched to CBS.

Awards
Key won the National Cartoonists Society's Newspaper Panel Cartoon Award for 1977 for Hazel.

References

Sources
Strickler, Dave. Syndicated Comic Strips and Artists, 1924-1995: The Complete Index. Cambria, California: Comics Access, 1995.

External links
Hazel at King Features
Toonopedia entry
NCS Awards

1943 comics debuts
1993 comics endings
American comics characters
American comic strips
Comic strips set in the United States
Comics about women
Comics adapted into television series
Comics characters introduced in 1943
Female characters in comics
Fictional maids
Gag-a-day comics
Gag cartoon comics